Old Wykehamists are former pupils of Winchester College, so called in memory of the school's founder, William of Wykeham. He was Bishop of Winchester and Lord Chancellor of England. He used the wealth these positions gave him to establish both the school and a university college, New College, Oxford, in 1382; both of them were set up to provide an education for 70 scholars. Winchester College opened in 1394. 
William of Wykeham provided that up to two pupils a year who could prove they were his descendants could attend the school at its expense; they were known as Consanguineus Fundatoris, "Founder's Kin". Ranulph Twisleton-Wykeham-Fiennes records that the tradition ended in 1868, by which time fourteen members of his family had received a free education. At first only a small number of pupils other than scholars were admitted; by the 15th century the school had around 100 pupils in total, nominally the 70 scholars, 16 choirboys and the rest "commoners". Demand for places for commoners was high, and though at first restricted, numbers gradually rose. From the 1860s, ten boarding houses, each for up to sixty pupils, were added, greatly increasing the school's capacity. By 2020, the number of pupils had risen to 690.

The school's traditions include a 600-year-old ceremony in which the Warden, wearing the Founder's Ring, admits each new Scholar; "Illumina", an autumn celebration, in which candles are placed into niches all over the medieval walls around the playing fields; and "Morning Hills", held once a year, when all the school's pupils and teachers climb St Catherine's Hill for a roll call and prayers. 
 
The Ad Portas ("At the Gates") ceremony is held as an honour for distinguished guests and alumni; all members of the school stand in the medieval Chamber Court to hear the speeches. In 2011, nineteen alumni (and six more honoured in their absence), all Fellows of the Royal Society or Fellows of the British Academy, were welcomed Ad Portas, with speeches in Latin and English.

Among the Old Wykehamists listed here are four archbishops, including one of the school's earliest pupils, Henry Chichele; four field marshals; commanders of both Fighter Command and Bomber Command during the Second World War—Hugh Dowding and Charles Portal, respectively; and two Viceroys of India, Archibald Wavell and Frederic Thesiger. The many politicians include six Chancellors of the Exchequer: Henry Addington for the Tory Party; Robert Lowe for the Liberal Party; Stafford Cripps and Hugh Gaitskell for the Labour Party; and Geoffrey Howe and Rishi Sunak for the Conservative Party. Of these Henry Addington and Rishi Sunak went on to become Prime Minister.

The individuals listed are classified by decade or century of birth, with a note of how each distinguished himself. Those who won military medals are listed at the foot of the page; six Old Wykehamists have won Britain's highest military award, the Victoria Cross. Individuals are included here only if they have distinguished themselves at the highest level within their profession or achieved national recognition. Thus, for example, politicians are included only if they are members of the privy council or have a cabinet position; sportspeople, only if they have distinguished themselves in a national competition or represented their country; for soldiers, that they have reached a rank equivalent to major-general, or won a gallantry award; members of a profession, that they are recognised as distinguished by their profession's leading institution, such as being a fellow of the Royal Society or the Royal Academy of Music. As another example, national recognition in business means being chair or chief executive of a FTSE 100 company.

Fourteenth century

  Henry Chichele, Archbishop of Canterbury
  Thomas Beckington, statesman

Fifteenth century

  Thomas Chaundler, playwright and illustrator
  William Horman, translator
  William Grocyn, scholar
  William Warham, Archbishop of Canterbury
  Hugh Inge, Archbishop of Dublin
  Richard Pace, diplomat
  Richard Risby, friar

Sixteenth century

  Henry Cole, Roman Catholic priest
  Nicholas Udall, Headmaster of Eton and playwright
  Henry Garnet, complicit in the Gunpowder Plot
  John White, bishop
  Nicholas Harpsfield, Roman Catholic apologist
  Richard Reade, Lord Chancellor of Ireland
  Nicholas Sanders, Roman Catholic priest, missionary and historian
  Thomas Bilson, bishop
  John Harmar, Warden of Winchester College, one of the translators of the Authorised Version of the Bible
  John Owen, Welsh epigrammatist
  Henry Wotton, author and diplomat
  Arthur Lake, bishop
  John Davies, poet
  Thomas James, librarian
  Thomas Coryat, travel writer, court jester to James I
  Henry Marten, Judge of Admiralty
  Thomas Ryves, lawyer
  Richard Zouch, judge and politician
  Edward Nicholas, statesman

Seventeenth century

  Nathaniel Fiennes, Roundhead politician
  Thomas Ken, bishop, non-juror and hymnwriter
  Francis Turner, bishop and non-juror
  Thomas Otway, dramatist
  Thomas Browne, doctor, polymath, scholar, prose stylist
  Anthony Ashley-Cooper, 3rd Earl of Shaftesbury, politician and author
  William Somervile, poet
  Edward Young, poet

Eighteenth century

  Robert Lowth, Bishop of London, Hebraist and English grammarian
  William Whitehead, Poet Laureate
  William Collins, poet
  Joseph Warton, literary critic and Headmaster of Winchester
  William Douglas, 4th Duke of Queensberry, nobleman, and a noted gambler
  Thomas Warton, Poet Laureate
  James Eyre, judge
  Charles Wolfran Cornwall, Speaker of the House of Commons
  James Woodforde, clergyman and diarist
  George Isaac Huntingford, Bishop of Hereford and Gloucester
  Thomas Burgess, author
  Henry Addington, 1st Viscount Sidmouth, Prime Minister
  John Hawkins, geologist, traveller, and Fellow of the Royal Society
  William Lisle Bowles, poet who revived the sonnet
  William Howley, Archbishop of Canterbury
  William Sturges Bourne, Tory politician, Home Secretary
  Sydney Smith, essayist and satirist
  Richard Mant, Church of Ireland bishop and writer
  John Colborne, 1st Baron Seaton, Field Marshal and colonial governor
  William Buckland, theologian and geologist
  William Ward, record-scoring cricketer
  Thomas Arnold, headmaster of Rugby
  Walter Farquhar Hook, Tractarian vicar of Leeds
  Thomas Oliphant, musician and lyricist

Nineteenth century

1800–1819
  William Page Wood, 1st Baron Hatherley, Lord Chancellor
  George Moberly, Headmaster of Winchester College, later Bishop of Salisbury
  William Sewell, divine and author
  Christopher Wordsworth, Bishop of Lincoln
  Thomas Adolphus Trollope, author
  James Edwards Sewell, Warden of New College, Oxford.
  Robert Lowe, 1st Viscount Sherbrooke, statesman
  William George Ward, prominent in the Oxford Movement
  William Monsell, 1st Baron Emly, Liberal politician
  Roundell Palmer, 1st Earl of Selborne
  Arthur Farmer, cricketer
  Anthony Trollope, novelist
  Nicholas Darnell, cricketer
  John Strange, cricketer

1820–1839

  William Grasett Clarke, cricketer and clergyman
  Matthew Arnold, poet
  James Freeling, cricketer and clergyman
  Frank Buckland, naturalist
  Arthur Ridding, cricketer, educator and librarian
  George Ridding, Headmaster of Winchester, later Bishop of Southwell
  Henry Furneaux, scholar of Tacitus
  William Tuckwell, Christian socialist clergyman and author of Reminiscences of Oxford
  Samuel Rawson Gardiner, historian
  Richard Bickerton Pemell Lyons, 2nd Baron Lyons, 1st Viscount and Earl Lyons, diplomat
  Philip Lutley Sclater, lawyer, ornithologist (founder of Ibis), zoogeographer, Secretary of the Zoological Society of London for 42 years
  Ford North, Judge of the High Court of Justice and member of the Judicial Committee of the Privy Council
  Ashley Eden, colonial administrator, member of the Council of India
  Cecil Fiennes, cricketer, descendant of William of Wykeham
  Philip Reginald Egerton, founder of Bloxham School
  Arthur Faber, headmaster of Malvern College
  Wingfield Fiennes, cricketer and clergyman, descendant of William of Wykeham

1840–1859

  Herbert Stewart, soldier
  Robert Campbell Moberly, theologian
  Samuel Rolles Driver, biblical scholar
  Thomas Hughes, footballer who won the FA Cup twice in the 1870s
  William Lindsay, England footballer and three times FA Cup winner
  Leonard Howell, Wanderers and England footballer
  Charles Marriott, cricketer and barrister
  Francis Birley, footballer who won the FA Cup three times in the 1870s
  Theodore Dyke Acland, physician-in-ordinary to Queen Victoria
  Charles Alfred Cripps, 1st Baron Parmoor, Lord President of the Council
  John Bain, England footballer and 1877 FA Cup Finalist
  John Hewett, Lieutenant Governor of Agra and Oudh
  Ponsonby Ogle, writer and journalist
  Montague John Druitt, suspected of being Jack the Ripper
  David Samuel Margoliouth, orientalist
  G. E. M. Skues, pioneer of fly fishing with nymphs
  William Palmer, 2nd Earl of Selborne, Lord Chancellor
  Percival Parr, footballer and barrister

1860–1869

  Francis J. Haverfield, historian of Roman Britain
  Edward Grey, 1st Viscount Grey of Fallodon, Foreign Secretary 1905–16
  Arthur Cayley Headlam, Principal of King's College London (1903–16) Bishop of Gloucester (1923–45)
  Frederic G. Kenyon, classical scholar
  Robert Laurie Morant, administrator and educator
  Arthur Cobb, wicket-keeper on early tour of America
  John Beresford Leathes, physiologist
  Harold Goodeve Ruggles-Brise, cricketer and soldier
  H. A. L. Fisher, historian, politician
  Arthur Pearson, newspaper magnate, founder of the Daily Express
  Herbert Lyon, cricketer
  Frederic Thesiger, 1st Viscount Chelmsford, Colonial Governor and Viceroy of India
  Claud Schuster, 1st Baron Schuster, Permanent Secretary to the Lord Chancellor 1915–1944
  General Reginald Byng Stephens, soldier
  Ernest Makins, soldier, statesman and politician

1870–1879

  Bernard Granville Baker, soldier, author, military artist
  Lord Alfred "Bosie" Douglas, poet and companion of Oscar Wilde
  Edmund Fellowes, musicologist, clergyman
  Alnod Boger, cricketer
  Thomas Case, cricketer and brewer
  Udny Yule, statistician
  Edmund Backhouse, "The Hermit of Peking"
  William Case, cricketer
  Vyner Brooke, Rajah of Sarawak
  Ewart Grogan, explorer and colonist
  Thomas Henderson, cricketer and surgeon
  Rupert D'Oyly Carte, Savoy opera producer, hotelier 
  William Sealy Gosset, statistician with Guinness (inventor of Student's t-test)
  G. H. Hardy, mathematician and mentor of Ramanujan
  Robert Lock Graham Irving, schoolmaster, writer and mountaineer
  Leopold George Wickham Legg, historian and editor of the Dictionary of National Biography
  Henry Howard, 19th Earl of Suffolk, peer
  Percy Bates, shipbuilder and Inkling
 Warren Fisher, Permanent Secretary of the Treasury, first Head of the Home Civil Service
  Edward Grigg, 1st Baron Altrincham, colonial administrator and politician
  Eric Maclagan, Director of the Victoria and Albert Museum
  Alan Reynolds, cricketer and soldier
  Jack White, trade union organiser, Irish republican and socialist who co-founded the Irish Citizen Army
  Ralph Williams, cricketer and barrister
  Alfred Eckhard Zimmern, Zionist historian and political scientist

1880–1889

  Maurice Bonham-Carter, politician and cricketer
  Robert Darling, Scottish cricketer
  Boyd Merriman, 1st Baron Merriman, politician
  Hugh Dowding, 1st Baron Dowding, Battle of Britain commander
  Henry Morshead, Himalayan explorer and mountaineer
  Archibald Wavell, 1st Earl Wavell, Field Marshal and Viceroy of India
  Adam Fox, theologian and Inkling
  Robert Hamilton Moberly, bishop
  Charles Malan, postmaster-general of the United Provinces.
  Clarence Bruce, 3rd Baron Aberdare, peer
  George Mallory, mountaineer on first three British expeditions to Mount Everest
  William Reginald Halliday, Principal of King's College London (1928–1952)
  Apsley Cherry-Garrard Member of Captain Scott's expedition of 1912
  Arthur Stanley-Clarke, soldier
  Roundell Palmer, 3rd Earl of Selborne, Minister of Economic Warfare
  Basil Brooke, 1st Viscount Brookeborough, Prime Minister of Northern Ireland
  Charles Bewley, Irish diplomat
  Christopher Dawson, Roman Catholic historian
  Stafford Cripps, Labour politician
  Armstrong Gibbs, composer
  Charles Scott Moncrieff, translator of Proust
  Geoffrey Toye, composer and conductor
  Arnold J. Toynbee, historian
  Ralph H. Fowler, mathematical physicist

1890–1899

  A. P. Herbert, humorist and law reformer
  John William Fisher Beaumont, Chief Justice of the Bombay High Court
  John Campbell, cardiologist
  Olaf Caroe, writer and colonial administrator
  Spencer Leeson, headmaster and bishop
  Godfrey Rolles Driver, biblical scholar
  Charles Portal, 1st Viscount Portal of Hungerford, Marshal of the Royal Air Force
  Maxwell Woosnam, Olympic and Wimbledon lawn tennis champion and England football captain
  Robert Nichols, war poet
  Malcolm Trustram Eve, 1st Baron Silsoe, barrister
  George MacLeod, Very Rev Lord MacLeod of Fuinary, Moderator, Church of Scotland
  A. G. Macdonell, author, journalist and playwright
  Egon Pearson, statistician 
  Gilbert Ashton, cricketer and schoolmaster
  Oswald Mosley, British fascist leader
 Henry Gurney, colonial administrator, assassinated in Malaya
  John Sinclair, former Head of the Secret Intelligence Service (MI6)
  Edward Tennant, war poet
  Ronald Tree, Conservative MP and founder of Sandy Lane, Barbados
  Henry Mond, 2nd Baron Melchett, industrialist
  Gerard Wallop, 9th Earl of Portsmouth, landowner, far-right writer and politician
  Hubert Ashton, footballer, cricketer and politician
  Charles Brutton, cricketer
  Arthur Norrington, President of Trinity College, Oxford

Twentieth century

1900–1909

  Douglas Jardine, England cricketer
  David Eccles, 1st Viscount Eccles, Minister of State for the Arts
  Cecil Harmsworth King, newspaper publisher
  Claude Ashton, Essex cricketer and England footballer
  Anthony Asquith, film director
  E. E. Evans-Pritchard, anthropologist, author of Witchcraft, Oracles and Magic Among the Azande
  Francis Festing, Field Marshal
  Nowell Myres, archaeologist, Bodley's Librarian
  John Dring, Prime Minister of Bahawalpur
  George D'Oyly Snow, headmaster of Ardingly College and Bishop of Whitby
  Charles Bosanquet, academic
  Kenneth Clark, art historian and broadcaster
  Frank Ramsey, philosopher, mathematician, economist
  Patrick Balfour, 3rd Baron Kinross, writer on Islamic history
  John Snagge, Second World War BBC announcer
  Roger Makins, 1st Baron Sherfield, ambassador
  Colin Clark, economist and statistician
  Charles Francis Christopher Hawkes, archaeologist
  William Goodenough Hayter, diplomat, ambassador and Warden of New College, Oxford
  John Sparrow, literary critic and Warden of All Souls
  William Empson, literary critic
  Hugh Gaitskell, leader of the Labour Party
  Richard Wilberforce, Baron Wilberforce, Law Lord
  Richard Crossman, Labour politician and diarist
  Douglas Jay, Baron Jay, Labour politician
  Evelyn Shuckburgh, diplomat
  Douglas Dodds-Parker, soldier and politician

1910–1919

  Nicholas Monsarrat, naval officer, diplomat and author of The Cruel Sea
  John Stephenson, Lord Justice of Appeal
  John Fiennes, lawyer and parliamentary draftsman
  Roger Tredgold, fencer and psychiatrist
  John Pringle, zoologist
  Bruce Campbell, ornithologist, writer and broadcaster
  D. G. Champernowne, economist and mathematician
  Charles Madge, poet, Communist, sociologist
  Basil William Robinson, Asian art scholar and author
  Basil Martin Wright, inventor of the Peak flow meter
  Shaun Wylie, mathematician and Second World War Enigma and Tunny codebreaker
  Robert Irving, conductor
  Richard Synge, Nobel prize winning biochemist
  Lord Aldington, politician and businessman
  Stormont Mancroft, 2nd Baron Mancroft, government minister
  Michael Carver, Baron Carver, Field Marshal and philosopher
  Robert Conquest, historian specialising in Joseph Stalin's purges
  Monty Woodhouse, Philhellene and politician
  Julian Faber, businessman
  James Joll, historian
  Willie Whitelaw, politician
  George Jellicoe, aka Viscount Brocas, soldier, statesman, businessman, diplomat
  M. R. D. Foot, historian
  Morys Bruce, 4th Baron Aberdare, politician

1920–1929

  Henry Brandon, Law Lord
  Frank Thompson, SOE officer
  Anthony Storr, psychiatrist and author
  John Latham, artist
  Horace Barlow, neuroscientist
  Mark Bonham Carter, publisher and politician
  Tony Pawson, angler and cricketer
  Paul Britten Austin, translator of Swedish literature
  Peter Fowler, physicist working on elementary particles
  Hugh Beach, soldier, researcher into disarmament and ethics of war
  Freeman Dyson, physicist and mathematician
  H. Christopher Longuet-Higgins, theoretical chemist and cognitive scientist
  Geoffrey Warnock, philosopher and academic
  James Lighthill, applied mathematician working on fluid dynamics
  Michael Gow, general
  Brian Trubshaw, Concorde test pilot
  Michael S. Longuet-Higgins, mathematician and oceanographer
  Hubert Doggart, cricketer and schoolmaster
  Michael Dummett, philosopher
  John Balcombe, Lord Justice of Appeal
  Jack Boles, Director-General of the National Trust
  Geoffrey Howe, Lord Howe of Aberavon, politician
  Edgar Anstey, Civil Service psychologist to the Cuban Missile Crisis
  Ian Macdonald, mathematician
  Martin Beale, applied mathematician and statistician
  Jeremy Morse, banker and university chancellor
  Raymond Bonham Carter, banker
  Roger Wykeham Ellis, headmaster of Rossall and Marlborough
  John Lucas, philosopher
  Robert Shirley, 13th Earl Ferrers, politician

1930–1939

  Alasdair Milne, BBC Director General
  George Younger, 4th Viscount Younger of Leckie, Secretary of State for Defence
  Reginald Bosanquet, ITN newscaster
  Guy Antony Jameson, aeronautical engineer and mathematician
  David Thouless, Nobel prizewinning physicist
  Nicholas Mackintosh, experimental psychologist
  William Donaldson, writer and satirist; creator of Henry Root
  Julian Mitchell, playwright and screenwriter
  David Hannay, Baron Hannay of Chiswick, ambassador to the United Nations

  Jonathan D. Spence, historian and sinologist
  John Albery, scientist
  Ian Gow, politician
  Jonathan Parker, Lord Justice of Appeal
  Paul Bergne, intelligence officer, linguist and diplomat
  Peter Jay, economist, journalist and ambassador
 Christopher Miles, film director

1940–1949

  Richard Williamson, controversial bishop
  Mansoor Ali Khan Pataudi, captain of India's cricket team
  Tim Brooke-Taylor, comedian
  Andrew Large, banker and businessman
  Patrick Minford, economist
  Hew Pike, soldier
  Andrew Longmore, Lord Justice of Appeal
  Madhavrao Scindia, Indian cabinet minister
  Martin Nourse, Lord Justice of Appeal 
  Lord Jay of Ewelme, head of the Foreign Office
  Antony Beevor, military historian
  Richard Noble, designer of the ThrustSSC
  Timothy Lloyd, Lord Justice of Appeal

  Charles Sinclair, businessman, Warden of Winchester College 2014–2019
  David Clementi, financier, Warden of Winchester College 2008–2014

1950–1959

  Christopher Suenson-Taylor, 3rd Baron Grantchester, Labour peer
  Tim Eggar, Conservative politician
  Anthony Pawson, biochemist
  Nicholas Underhill, Lord Justice of Appeal
  Robyn Hitchcock, singer, songwriter
  Alan Lovell, businessman

  Nicholas Shepherd-Barron, mathematician
  James Mallet, evolutionary zoologist, winner of the Darwin–Wallace Medal
  James Younger, 5th Viscount Younger of Leckie, peer and politician
  Richard Stagg, ambassador, Warden of Winchester College 2019–
  Nicholas Shakespeare, novelist and journalist
  Michael Hofmann, poet and translator
  J.G. Sandom, author and interactive advertising pioneer
  Francis Pott, composer and pianist
  John Whittingdale, Culture Secretary
  John Campbell, economist

  Seumas Milne, journalist
  Jon Leyne, BBC foreign correspondent
  James Bucknall, soldier
  Peter Neyroud, police chief
  Nick Carter, Chief of the Defence Staff; Ad Portas, 2021

1960–1969
  David Soskice, political economist
  Korn Chatikavanij, banker and politician, finance minister of Thailand
  Joss Whedon, screenwriter and film director
  Nick Boles, Minister of State for Skills
  Charles Edwards, actor

1970–1979

  Saif Ali Khan, actor
  Alistair Potts, world champion cox
  Simon Henderson, Headmaster of Eton College
  Hugh Dancy, actor

1980–1989

Rishi Sunak, Prime Minister
  James Forsyth, journalist 
  Anthony Smith, sculptor
  George Nash, Olympic rower

Victoria Cross and George Cross holders

Six Old Wykehamists have won the Victoria Cross (VC), four in the First World War, 1914–18 (of whom three were killed in action) and two prior to 1914. Also in the Second World War one Old Wykehamist won the George Cross and one the George Medal, both in military circumstances.

Victoria Cross
Indian Mutiny
Lieutenant Alfred Spencer Heathcote VC (1832–1912) for his conduct during the Siege of Delhi
Boer War
Lieutenant Gustavus Hamilton Blenkinsopp Coulson VC DSO (1879–1901)
First World War
Captain Arthur Forbes Gordon Kilby VC, MC (1885–1915)
Second Lieutenant Dennis George Wyldbore Hewitt VC, (1897–1917)
Lieutenant Colonel Charles Hotham Montagu Doughty-Wylie VC, (1868–1915)
Lieutenant Colonel Daniel Burges VC, DSO, Croix de guerre avec Palme (1873–1946)
George Cross
Second World War
Sub-Lieutenant Peter Victor Danckwerts GC (1916–1984) for gallantry defusing mines dropped on London
George Medal
Second World War
Lieutenant Geoffrey Ambrose Hodges, RNVR (military, but for gallantry not in the face of the enemy)

See also 

 Winchester College in fiction, with a list of the many fictional Old Wykehamists in literature

References

Cited sources

 Badcock, C. F.; La Corrie, J. R. Winchester College: A Register for the Years 1930 To 1975. Winchester College, 1992.
 Dilke, Christopher. Dr Moberly's Mint-Mark: A Study of Winchester College. London, 1965.
 Firth, J. D'E. Winchester College. Winchester, 1961.
 Hardy, H. J. Winchester College, 1867–1920 P. and G. Wells, 1923.
 Lamb, L. H. Winchester College A Register 1915–1960. P. & G. Wells, 1974.
 Leach, Arthur F. A History of Winchester College. London and New York, 1899.
 Maclure, P. S. W. K.; Stevens, R. P. Winchester College, A Register. Winchester College, 2014.
 Sabben-Clare, James. Winchester College. Paul Cave Publications, 1981.
 Wainewright, John Bannerman (ed). Winchester College 1836–1906: A Register. P. and G. Wells, 1907.

Winchester

Winchester College
Wykehamists